Jack Innard (born 3 July 1995) is a professional rugby union player for Premiership Rugby side the Exeter Chiefs. He plays as a Hooker in the front row.

Innard scored two tries on 30 March as Exeter beat Bath Rugby in the final of the Anglo-Welsh Cup.

Innard has also represented Cornish Pirates and England U20’s.

Honours
Anglo-Welsh Cup
Winners 2017–18

References

1997 births
Living people
Rugby union hookers
British rugby union players
Exeter Chiefs players
Rugby union players from Truro